Formica rufa, also known as the  red wood ant, southern wood ant, or horse ant, is a boreal member of the Formica rufa group of ants, and is the type species for that group, being described already by Linneaus. It is native to Eurasia, with a recorded distribution stretching from the middle of Scandinavia to the northern Iberia and Anatolia, and from Great Britain to Lake Baikal, with unconfirmed reportings of it also to the Russian Far East. There are claims that it can be found in North America, but this is not confirmed in specialised literature, and no recent publication where North American wood ants are listed mentions it as present, while records from North America are all listed as dubious or unconfirmed in a record compilation. Workers head and thorax are colored red and the abdomen brownish-black, usually with a dorsal dark patches on the head and promensonotum, although some individuals may be more uniform reddish and even have some red on the part of the gastern facing the body. In order to separate them from closely related species, specimens needs to be inspected under magnification, where difference in hairyness are among the telling characteristics, with Formica rufa being more hairy than per example Formica polyctena but less hairy than Formica lugubris. Workers are polymorphic, measuring 4.5–9 mm in length. They have large mandibles, and like many other ant species, they are able to spray formic acid from their abdomens as a defence. Formic acid was first extracted in 1671 by the English naturalist John Ray by distilling a large number of crushed ants of this species. These ants primarily eat honeydew from aphids. Some groups form large networks of connected nests with multiple queen colonies, while others have single-queen colonies.

Description

Nests of these ants are large, conspicuous, dome-shaped mounds of grass, twigs, or conifer needles, often built against a rotting stump, usually situated in woodland clearings where the sun's rays can reach them. Large colonies may have 100,000 to 400,000 workers and 100 queens. F. rufa is highly polygynous and often readopts postnuptial queens from its own mother colony, leading to old, multigallery nests that may contain well over 100 egg-producing females. These colonies often may measure several metres in height and diameter. F. rufa is aggressively territorial, and often attacks and removes other ant species from the area. Nuptial flights take place during the springtime and are often marked by savage battles between neighbouring colonies as territorial boundaries are re-established.  New nests are established by budding from existing nests in the spring, or by the mechanism of temporary social parasitism, the hosts being species of the F. fusca group, notably F. fusca and F. lemani, although incipient F. rufa colonies have also been recorded from nests of F. glebaria, F. cunnicularia, and similar species including the genus Lasius. An F. rufa queen ousts the nest's existing queen, lays eggs, and the existing workers care for her offspring until the nest is taken over.

Diet

These ants' primary diet is aphid honeydew, but they also prey on invertebrates such as insects and arachnids; they are voracious scavengers. Foraging trails may extend 100 m. Larger workers have been observed to forage farther away from the nest. F. rufa commonly is used in forestry and often is introduced into an area as a form of pest management.

Behavior

Nursing
Worker ants in F. rufa have been observed to practice parental care or perform cocoon nursing. A worker ant goes through a sensitive phase, where it becomes accustomed to a chemical stimulus emitted by the cocoon. The sensitive phase occurs at an early and specific period. An experiment was conducted by Moli et al. to test how worker ants react to different types of cocoon: homospecific and heterospecific cocoons. If the worker ant is brought up in the absence of cocoons, it will show neither recognition nor nursing behaviour. Both types of cocoons are opened up by the workers and devoured for nutrients. When accustomed to only the homospecific cocoons, the workers collect both types of cocoons, but only place and protect the homospecific cocoons. The heterospecific cocoons are neglected and abandoned in the nest and eaten. Lastly, if heterospecific cocoons were injected with extract from the homospecific cocoons, the workers tend to both types of cocoons equally. This demonstrates that a chemical stimulus from the cocoons seems to be of paramount importance in prompting adoption behaviour in worker ants. However, the specific chemical / stimulus has not been identified.

Foraging behaviour
The foraging behaviour of wood ants changes according to the environment. Wood ants have been shown to tend and harvest aphids and prey on and compete with, other predators for food resources. They tend to prey on the most plentiful members of the community whether they are in the canopies of trees or in the forest foliage. Wood ants seem to favour prey that lives in local canopies near their nest; however, when food resources dwindle, they seek other trees further from the nests and explore more trees instead of exploring the forest floor more thoroughly. This makes foraging for food significantly less efficient, but the rest of the nest does not help the foraging ants.

Kin behaviour
Wood ants have shown aggressive behaviour toward their own species in certain situations. Intraspecific competition usually occurs early in the spring between workers of competing nests. This aggression may be linked to the protection of maintaining territory and trail. By observing skirmishes and trail formation of wood ants, the territory surrounding each nest differs between seasons. Permanent foraging trails are reinforced each season, and if an ant from an alien species crossed it, hostile activity occurs. Most likely, the territory changes based on foraging patterns are influenced by seasonal changes.

Ants recognize their nestmates through chemical signals. Failure in recognition causes the colony integrity to decay. Heavy metals accumulated through the environment alter the aggression levels. This could be due to a variety of factors such as changes in physiological effect or changes in resource levels. The ants in these territories tend to be less productive and efficient. Increased resource competition would be expected to increase level of aggression, but this is not the case.

Colony structure
Different types of F. rufa group species have demonstrated different types of social interaction. Some groups are highly polygynous, with multiple queen colonies forming large networks of connected nests. Others are monogynous, with single-queen colonies. Different F. rufa ants from different regions have been recorded as having traits of being both polygynous and monogynous. The females in the F. rufa colonies that are monogynous separate by flight and establish new nests. Queens in polygynous nests form new nests in the vicinity of the original nest with the help of workers. Through evolution, polygyny may have arisen through monogyny. One possibility is that monogynous nests due to environmental and physiological conditions may take up new queens.
Sometimes in monogynous nests, daughters are recruited as new reproductives and the nest becomes polygynous.

Nest splitting
Wood ants typically have multiple nests so they may relocate in case of drastic changes in the environment. This splitting of nests causes the creation of multiple daughter nests. Several reasons occur as to why wood ants move. Such as a change in availability of food resources, attack by the population of another colony, or a change in the state of the nest itself. During this time, workers, queens, and the brood are transferred from the original nest to the daughter nest in a bilateral direction. The goal is to move to the daughter nest, but the transporting ants may bring an individual back to the original nest. The splitting process may last from a week to over a month.

Population
Turnover rate of wood ant nests is very quick. Within a period of three years, Klimetzek counted 248 nests within a 1,640 hectare area under study. Furthermore, no evidence of a correlation between nest age and mortality was found. Smaller nests had lower life expectancy compared to larger nests. The size of the nests increased as the nest aged.

Bee paralysis virus
In 2008, the chronic bee paralysis virus was reported for the first time in this and another species of ants, Camponotus vagus. CBPV affects bees, ants, and mites.

References

External links

 Southern wood ant , southern wood ant pictures Macro photography of southern wood ant

rufa
Hymenoptera of Europe
Insects described in 1761
Taxa named by Carl Linnaeus